Oru Kochukatha Aarum Parayatha Katha is a 1984 Indian Malayalam-language film, directed by P. G. Vishwambharan and produced by Jessy Prakash. The film stars Mammootty, Thilakan, Nedumudi Venu and Saritha in the lead roles. The film has musical score by A. T. Ummer. It is the remake of the 1978 Hindi film Saajan Bina Suhagan, also remade into Tamil as Mangala Nayaki in 1980. This movie marks the debut of Meena (actress) in malayalam as a child artist.

Plot
Aravindan is an assistant manager in a tea plantation in Munnar. He lives with his wife Janu and three daughters. They follow a happy life until he discovers that he has lung cancer. The doctor suggests him to move to Tata Institute for further treatment. He informs Mammukka about the same and leaves for Bombay lying to his family that he has been promoted as a manager. Meanwhile, Dr. Surendran shifts to Munnar as the family's new neighbour. The youngest daughter of the family, Rajani acquaints with him and introduces him to her mother. The flashback shows about a romantic relationship between Surendran and Janu where their marriage was fixed. Surendran meets with an accident and becomes impotent. He convinces Janu to leave him and marry someone else. The present life shows how Surendran becomes closer to the family. Rajini suffers from a heart problem and Dr. Surendran becomes a helping hand for the treatment. Aravindan's health worsen in Bombay and he asks Mammukka to inform his wife about his ill health. Aravindan has a helping hand called Shankhu in the hospital. Aravindan dies in the presence of Janu in the hospital. Shankhu threatens Janu about informing the kids about their father's death which could cause Rajini, the girl with the weak heart to die. Janu comes back to Munnar and pretends that Aravindan is recovering and does not tell her kids about the death. Shankhu visits her now and is again blackmailing for gold and money. As the last resort, he takes away Janu's marital gold chain and threatens to return it only if he is given ten thousand rupees. Surendran, knowing all truth about Janu, comes to her rescue and beats up Shankhu. He surrenders to the police saying that he murdered Shankhu. Hearing the news, Rajini becomes unconscious. The court leaves Surendran on bail to operate on Rajani. After he returns, he is sent out of jail as the police receive a complaint that Surendran is innocent. Janu confesses to the CBI, who is now handling the case, that she had murdered Shankhu. She had done so because Shankhu had tried to rape her and to save herself she did so. Police arrest her, but the court leaves her considering her circumstances of the crime. The movie ends on a happy note.

Cast
Mammootty as Dr. Surendran 
Saritha as Janu 
Nedumudi Venu as Aravindan 
Thilakan as Mammukka 
Ashokan 
T. G. Ravi
Baby Meena as Rajani (child artist)

Soundtrack
The music was composed by A. T. Ummer with lyrics by Bichu Thirumala.

References

External links
 
 

1984 films
1980s Malayalam-language films
Films directed by P. G. Viswambharan
Films scored by A. T. Ummer